Alaeddine Abbès (born 6 February 1990) is a Tunisian footballer who plays as an attacking midfielder. He played in the Tunisian Ligue Professionnelle 1 for Étoile Sahel, ES Zarzis, Olympique Béja, AS Marsa, Stade Tunisien, Kairouan and Étoile Métlaoui. He was a squad member for the 2007 FIFA U-17 World Cup.

References

External links
 

1990 births
Living people
Tunisian footballers
Tunisia youth international footballers
Tunisian expatriate footballers
Étoile Sportive du Sahel players
ES Zarzis players
Olympique Béja players
AS Marsa players
Stade Tunisien players
JS Kairouan players
ES Métlaoui players
Al-Nahda Club (Saudi Arabia) players
Al-Washm Club players
Tunisian Ligue Professionnelle 1 players
Saudi First Division League players
Saudi Second Division players
Expatriate footballers in Saudi Arabia
Tunisian expatriate sportspeople in Saudi Arabia
Association football midfielders